The U.S. state of Oregon has various policies restricting the production, sale, and use of different substances.  In 2006, Oregon's per capita drug use exceeded the national average.  The most used substances were marijuana, methamphetamine and illicit painkillers and stimulants.

On February 1, 2021, Oregon became the first state in the USA to decriminalize the possession of small quantities of all illicit drugs, following the passing of Oregon Ballot Measure 110 in November 2020.

Specific drugs

Alcohol 

Oregonians consume an average amount of beer and distilled spirits, and an above average amount of wine. As of 2007, the consumption of spirits is on the rise, while beer consumption is holding steady. Also, 11% of beer sold in Oregon was brewed in-state, the highest figure in the United States.

Oregon was the first place in the United States to prohibit alcohol, prior to becoming a U.S. state in the mid-19th century. That law was quickly repealed, but Oregon again preceded the rest of the country in outlawing alcohol, passing a law several years before federal prohibition was enacted with the Eighteenth Amendment to the United States Constitution. Following the repeal of prohibition in 1933, Oregon acted swiftly to regulate alcohol, establishing the Oregon Liquor Control Commission (OLCC) within days of the repeal. The OLCC continues to regulate alcohol in the state today.

Cannabis 

From 1999 through 2005, the ratio of Oregonians using cannabis outpaced the general United States population by 32–45%, with between 6.53% (2000) and 8.96% (2002) of the population using it. In 2003–2004, Oregon ranked among the top five states for cannabis usage of people 12 and older. Oregon is also one of the largest cannabis producing states, ranking fourth in indoor production, and 10th overall in 2006.

In 1973, Oregon became the first U.S. state to decriminalize the possession of small amounts of cannabis, and in 1998 the state legalized its use for medical purposes. An attempt to recriminalize possession of small amounts of cannabis was turned down by Oregon voters in 1997. In June 2010, Oregon became the first state in the country to reclassify marijuana from a Schedule I drug to a Schedule II drug when the Oregon Board of Pharmacy voted for reclassification. Recreational cannabis has been legal in the state since July 2015.

Club drugs
In Oregon, MDMA (3,4-methylenedioxymethamphetamine), GHB (gamma-hydroxybutyrate), ketamine, and [(lysergic acid diethylamide) are available in varying quantities and are generally used at social venues in more populated areas and on college campuses. Club drugs enter Oregon from a variety of sources: MDMA from Canada, ketamine from Mexico, and GHB and LSD from California. Laboratory seizures indicate some local GHB and LSD production. GHB is also obtained from Internet sources. PCP and Psilocybin mushrooms are generally available in and around cities with a college student population.<...Update<.DEA/.,online hearing-say.The possession of LSD  Now legal, as for all psychedelic medications are acceptable by public safety and,awareness.(2023).

Cocaine
Cocaine is available throughout Oregon, and crack cocaine is available in some urban areas.  Mexican traffickers dominate wholesale distribution, transporting the drug from Mexico, California, and other southwestern states. Retail quantities are primarily sold by Mexican drug trafficking organizations, street gangs, prison gangs, and local independent dealers.  In 2007, 63.7 pounds of cocaine were seized by federal authorities, up from 36.4 pounds in 2006.

Heroin
In the 1990s, potent and inexpensive heroin became widely available in Portland; heroin use in Multnomah County rose 600% during that decade.

According to police, in 2008, heroin became more plentiful in Oregon in response to a crackdown on methamphetamine.  In 2007, 115 heroin overdoses resulted in death, up 29% from 2006.  In 2012 heroin was responsible for 147 deaths, and the leading cause of overdose deaths in the state.  The number of deaths is far below the highs of the late 1990s.  Most deaths are a result of the user misgauging their tolerance.  Heroin is especially lethal because it depresses the central nervous system, unlike cocaine and meth which are stimulants.

In Oregon, black tar heroin comes from Mexico up the Interstate 5 corridor.  In 2007, 19 pounds of heroin were seized by federal authorities, more than double the amount in 2006.

Methamphetamine 

Since its arrival in the early 1980s, the use of methamphetamine in Oregon has become a serious public health problem. Abuse of methamphetamine (commonly known as "crystal meth" or simply "meth") has spread across the state and the rest of the United States.  The issue has been a focus of media organizations in the state, and has been a focus of several political campaigns, including that of Attorney General-elect John Kroger in 2008, and ballot measures such as Measures 57 and 61 in the same year.

In 2005, Governor Ted Kulongoski signed legislation that made Oregon the first state to require prescriptions for cold medicines containing pseudoephedrine, one of the key ingredients used to make methamphetamine.  The state had previously required buyers to show ID and sign a log when buying cold medicine like Sudafed and Claritin D.  The intent of the law was to reduce the number of home methamphetamine laboratories.  Oregon's monthly home drug lab seizures dropped from 41 to nine after the restrictions were put in place, but the drug is still available, coming from Mexican labs and from other states.  Meth-related deaths decreased for the first time since 2001, when 2007 deaths declined 21% from 2006 deaths.

In 2007, 33 pounds of meth were seized by federal authorities, down from 101.6 pounds in 2006.

Prescription drugs
Illicit use of prescription drugs is the fastest growing category of illegal drug use.  Treatment admissions for illicit prescription drugs increased 332% from 1998 to 2008, surpassing cocaine admissions in 2005.  In the United States, the primary methods of diversion of legitimate pharmaceuticals is illegal dispensing and prescribing by physicians, illegal distribution by pharmacists, prescription forgery, doctor shopping, and drug thefts from pharmacies, nursing homes, and hospitals. Pharmacy burglaries are prevalent throughout the state and Diversion Investigators are also encountering pharmaceuticals that have been purchased via the Internet without a doctor's prescription. The use and sale of oxycodone (OxyContin, Percocet, Percodan), hydrocodone (Vicodin, Lortab), and anabolic steroids are of concern to the Drug Enforcement Administration.  Also, as of January 2008, methadone use has increased dramatically in the state.

Psilocybin and psilocybin mushrooms
As part of the passing of Oregon Ballot Measure 110, which came into effect on February 1, 2021, the personal possession of psilocybin and psilocybin mushrooms (also known as "magic mushrooms") was decriminalized.

As part of Oregon Ballot Measure 109 the "manufacture, delivery and administration" of psilocybin and psilocybin mushrooms was legalized for those aged 21 and over for medical purposes, such as mental health treatment and use in supervised and licensed therapy sessions.

Tobacco

Oregon's Tobacco Prevention and Education Program (TPEP) was launched in 1997 to "reduce tobacco-related illness and death" by reducing exposure to secondhand smoke, countering pro-tobacco influences, helping users to quit, and eliminating health disparities. , the current tax on a pack of cigarettes is $1.33, and the wholesale tax on other tobacco products is 65%.  House Bill 2270 was referred to voters by the legislature as Measure 108 for the 2020 general election, to raise the cigarette tax to $3.33 per pack, increase a cap on cigar taxes from 50¢ to $1.00 each, and apply the wholesale tax to electronic cigarettes. Measure 108 was passed by voters, signed into law and effective January 1, 2021.

Smoking in bars and similar businesses is prohibited in Oregon as of a law that took effect January 2009 (SB 571 of the 2007 legislature.)

Usage 
In 2008, academic researchers began studying waste water at various Oregon sewage plants, to evaluate the drug use of various communities. Their research is pioneering the field in the United States, though similar studies have been done in Europe. Every one of the samples, taken from 96 plants, contained methamphetamine; Cocaine was present in 80% of the samples, MDMA in 40%. the research is ongoing, and will evaluate some of the plants—along with plants in Washington—over time.

Penalties
475.894 Unlawful possession of methamphetamine. (1) It is unlawful for any person knowingly or intentionally to possess methamphetamine unless the substance was obtained directly from, or pursuant to, a valid prescription or order of a practitioner while acting in the course of professional practice, or except as otherwise authorized by ORS 475.005 to 475.285 and 475.752 to 475.980.

      (2)(a) Unlawful possession of methamphetamine is a Class A misdemeanor.

      (b) Notwithstanding paragraph (a) of this subsection, unlawful possession of methamphetamine is a Class C felony if:

      (A) The person possesses a usable quantity of methamphetamine and:

      (i) At the time of the possession, the person has a prior felony conviction;

      (ii) At the time of the possession, the person has two or more prior convictions for unlawful possession of a usable quantity of a controlled substance; or

      (iii) The possession is a commercial drug offense under ORS 475.900 (1)(b); or

      (B) The person possesses two grams or more of a mixture or substance containing a detectable amount of methamphetamine. [2005 c.708 §18; 2017 c.706 §15]eroin, LSD, peyote, mescaline, and psilocybin are Schedule I drugs, and with the exception of marijuana their manufacture or distribution is a class A felony carrying a maximum of 20 years in prison. Opium, cocaine, amphetamine and methamphetamine are Schedule II drugs, whose manufacturing or distribution is a class B felony, and can carry a sentence up to 10 years. However, Oregon uses a felony "grid block" system for the sentencing of nearly all felony crimes including all drug crimes which takes into account the severity of the crime and the criminal history of the defendant. In actuality, sentences imposed in drug delivery cases are much less than 20 or 10 years, despite being class A or B felonies. Manufacturing and distribution cases involving very large amounts of drugs are often passed to the U.S. Attorney for prosecution. Under the federal guidelines, sentences can be much longer, exceeding 20 years in some cases. Dealing more than four ounces of marijuana is also a Class B felony.  Depressants, and PCP are Schedule III drugs, and various prescription drugs are a Schedule II.  The sale and distribution of Schedule III and IV drugs carry lighter penalties than the ones associated with Schedule I and II.

The penalties for sale of a controlled substance varies between states.  In Oregon, a person convicted three times of selling 3.3 pounds of meth would face a maximum of four years in prison.  By comparison, the potential penalty would be 13 years in prison in California, 21 years in federal court, and up to life in Texas.  Former Oregon lawmaker Kevin Mannix wants to increase these penalties, saying the state "invites" criminal drug activity "by being passive."  Mannix put a citizen's initiative on the November 2008 ballot, Measure 61. The measure was defeated, while a less expensive measure referred by the legislature, Measure 57, passed.  Mannix's opponents argued that increased mandatory minimum sentences remove judicial discretion and send small-time dealers into expensive prisons instead of drug treatment.

References 

Controlled substances in Oregon